Wuyuzhang Honorary College, also transliterated as Wu Yuzhang Honors College (official Chinese name: Simplified Chinese: 吴玉章学院; Traditional Chinese: 吳玉章學院; general name: Simplified Chinese: 吴玉章荣誉学院; Traditional Chinese：吳玉章榮譽學院), is an undergraduate college of Sichuan University.

Introduction

Named after famous educator and former Sichuan University President, Wuyuzhang Honorary College was founded in 2006 and the dean of the college is Professor Lin Zhang, the vice president of Sichuan University.

The Wuyuzhang Honors College takes "first-class students, first-class faculties, first-class courses, first-class management, first-class talents" as its tenet. The Honors College motto is "honor and erudition, modesty and kindness". The college principles of talent training are "value shaping, interdisciplinary training, potential unleashing, and international vision". Combining the university's multidisciplinary strengths with high-quality teaching, the Honors College creates an extraordinary environment for outstanding undergraduate students to think, explore and innovate independently, critically and boundlessly. Combined with the college's strong disciplines, excellent faculty, and digital facilities, students can fully tap their potential and become leaders, creators, inventors, and pioneers.

References

External links
 Wuyuzhang Honors College Official Website 
 Sichuan University 

Universities and colleges in Chengdu
Sichuan University